Möllen is the southernmost administrative district of Voerde in Wesel district, North Rhine-Westphalia, having 3040 inhabitants.

History

The Haus Wohnung (the region's water castle) was built in the fourteenth century. The former school was established in 1911. The town was a scene of some of the fighting during the suppression of the Ruhr uprising. The Protestant church was built between 1960 and 1965 and the Catholic Church of St. Barbara in 1963.

Villages in North Rhine-Westphalia